Alice Eve Shapley is a professor at the University of California, Los Angeles (UCLA) in the Department of Physics and Astronomy. She was one of the discoverers of the spiral galaxy BX442. Through her time at University of California, Los Angeles (UCLA) she has taught Nature of the Universe, Black Holes and Cosmic Catastrophes,Cosmology: Our Changing Concepts of the Universe, Galaxies, Scientific Writing, AGNs, Galaxies, *and* Writing, and The Formation and Evolution of Galaxies and the IGM.  Shapley has committed herself too over a two decades of research and publication in the interest of physics and astronomy.

Education
Shapley received an A.B. in Astronomy, Astrophysics, and Physics at Harvard and Radcliffe Colleges in 1997, and a Ph.D. in Astronomy at the California Institute of Technology in 2003.

Research Areas
Shapley's research areas are based on galaxy formation and evolution, the feedback processes in starburst galaxies, stellar populations at high redshift, and the evolution of the inter-galactic medium at high redshift. Through her research she has acquired over $5 million dollars in research funding.

Employment 
Since 2013 Alice Shapley has held the position of Department of Physics and Astronomy Professor. From 2003-2005 while at the University of California at Berkley she was a Miller Postdoctoral Fellow. She has also held the position of Associate Professor in the Department of Physics and Astronomy, as well as Assistant Professor in the Department of Astrophysical Sciences. Alice Shapley went as far as to hold the position of Vice Chair for Astronomy and Astrophysics at UCLA from 2018–2022. Shapley has also spent time teaching at Princeton in the areas of astronomy and physics.

Publications
Alice has been listed as a contributing author on 100 publications dating back to 2000. She is listed as the primary author in eight publications, including “The Direct Detection of Lyman-Continuum Emission from Star-forming Galaxies at z ~ 3”. Shapley can be found to either written or contributed to over 300 publications.

The Direct Detection of Lyman-Continuum Emission from Star-forming Galaxies at z ~ 3
UV spectroscopic observations of samples for z~ 3 star-forming galaxies showed uncharacteristically deep penetration into the Lyman continuum region. Ionizing radiation escaping from individual galaxies at high red shift were detected, and the ratio of emergent flux density to Lyman continuum region was determined. The collected data for the average emergent flux density ratio contradicted the escape fraction previously implied from past publications. The team was able to confirm estimates of the level of the ionizing background from galaxies and quasars, but the emergent far-UV spectra could not be confirmed. To help solve this problem, the group suggests taking a sample of LBGs with deep Lyman continuum measurements that is an order of magnitude larger and covers a larger range of luminosity than what they gathered.

Testing metallicity indicators at z~1.4 with the gravitationally lensed galaxy CASSOWARY 20
The star-forming galaxy CASSOWARY 20 was studied in this publication. Temperature and density-sensitive emission lines were used to generate physical properties of the system, as well as a chemical analysis of its atmosphere. The galaxy was found to have a surprisingly low carbon-to-oxygen ratio, suggesting it was quickly formed by a chemical reaction. Emission lines and absorption features allowed the group to determine the metallicity of CASSOWARY 20 with a small level of uncertainty. Large-scale outflows of interstellar medium were similar to related data from galaxies with higher rates of star formation.

Physical Properties of Galaxies from z = 2-4 
For this publication Shapley looks at a census of the methods used to find distant galaxies as well as the empirical constraints on their multi-wavelength luminosities and colors. She goes on to discuss what is already known about stellar content and past histories of star formation in high-redshift galaxies; their interstellar contents including dust, gas, and heavy elements; and their structural and dynamical properties. I conclude by considering some of the most pressing and open questions regarding the physics of high-redshift galaxies, which are to be addressed with future facilities. She concludes by looking at the unanswered mysteries of physics of high-redshift galaxies.

Awards and honors
1997, Leo Goldberg Prize, Harvard
 1997-1998, Virginia Gilloon Fellowship, California Institute of Technology
 1998-2001, NSF Graduate Research Fellowship
 2006–2008, Alfred P. Sloan Fellowship
 2006–2011, Packard Fellowship
 2009–2010, Member of “Galaxies Across Cosmic Time” Science Frontier Panel for Astro2010 Decadal Survey
 2010, McMaster Cosmology Lecture
 2011, 2013, 2016, 2017, 2018, 2020, UCLA Department of Physics and Astronomy Teaching Award
 2012, UCLA Department of Physics and Astronomy Teacher of the Year
 2014, Aaronson Lecture
 2016, Distinguished Women Scholar Series Lecturer, University of Victoria
 2018, Biermann Lecturer, Max Planck Institute for Astrophysics
 2019, Kavli Lecturer, American Astronomical Society Meeting
 2019-2020, Nominated Participant, UCLA Faculty Leadership Academy
2021, Fellow of the American Physical Society
2022, 132nd Faculty Research Lecturer, UCLA

Observing Experience
 Extensive experience in optical and near-infrared imaging and spectroscopy
 Palomar 200-inch telescope (COSMIC, LFC)
 Keck Observatory (LRIS, HIRES, ESI, NIRC, NIRSPEC)
 Hubble Space Telescope (WFPC2)

References

External links
 
  (Lecture Traveling Back in Time to the Birth of Galaxies begins at 4:58 in video.)

Year of birth missing (living people)
Living people
University of California, Los Angeles faculty
Place of birth missing (living people)
Radcliffe College alumni
California Institute of Technology alumni
Fellows of the American Physical Society